R Aquarii (R Aqr) is a variable star in the constellation Aquarius.

R Aquarii is a symbiotic star believed to contain a white dwarf and a Mira-type variable in a binary system. The orbital period is approximately 44 years. The main Mira-type star is a red giant, and varies in brightness by a factor of several hundred and with a period of slightly more than a year; this variability was discovered by Karl Ludwig Harding in 1810. It has a distance of about 390 parsecs, and is one of the nearest symbiotic stars and a well-known jet source.  The two components have been resolved at a separation of 55 mas.

By its gravitational pull, the white dwarf draws in material from the red giant and occasionally ejects some of the surplus in loops to form the nebula seen in the linked image. The whole system appears reddened because it is situated in a very dusty region of space, and its blue light is absorbed before reaching Earth.

The nebula around R Aquarii is also known as Cederblad 211.  It is possible that the nebula is the remnant of a nova-like outburst, which may have been observed by Japanese astronomers, in the year 930 AD.  It is reasonably bright but small and dominated by its central star.  Visual observations are difficult and rare.  The central region of the jet shows an ejection that took place around 190 years ago, as well as much younger structures.

The giant primary star is a Mira variable, a star that pulsates and changes temperature, leading to very large visual brightness changes.  The total range of 5.2 - 12.4 is a variation of 750 times in brightness, from a naked eye star to one beyond the range of binoculars.  The pulsations occur every 390 days but are not entirely regular.

Gallery

References

External links
 Weird loop image in R Aquarii
 
 
 AAVSO Variable Star of the Month. R Aquarii: Summer 2003
  R Aquarii (Cederblad 211) Visual observation of a symbiotic star

Aquarius (constellation)
M-type giants
Mira variables
Spectroscopic binaries
222800
Aquarii, R
8992
117054
Durchmusterung objects
Z Andromedae variables